The 1989 NBA Finals was the championship round of the 1988–89 National Basketball Association (NBA) season, and the conclusion of the 1989 NBA Playoffs. The series was a rematch of the previous year's championship round between the Eastern Conference playoff champion Detroit Pistons and the defending NBA champion and  Western Conference playoff champion Los Angeles Lakers. This, along with the 1983 NBA Finals, were the only two NBA championships of the 1980s not to be won by either the Lakers or the Boston Celtics; every NBA Finals of that decade featured either the Lakers or Celtics, and sometimes both (1984, 1985, 1987). Coincidentally, the Lakers were also swept in the 1983 NBA Finals, that time by the Philadelphia 76ers.

During the season, the Lakers had won their division, with Magic Johnson collecting his second MVP award. The team swept the first three playoff series (Pacific Division foes: Portland, Seattle, and Phoenix), resulting in a rematch with the Detroit Pistons in the Finals.

The Pistons had dominated the Eastern Conference, winning 63 games during the regular season. After sweeping the Boston Celtics and Milwaukee Bucks, the Pistons beat the Chicago Bulls in six games, earning a second straight trip to the NBA Finals. In the season before, the Lakers had beaten them in a tough, seven-game series.

The Pistons won the series in a four-game sweep of the injury-riddled Lakers, marking the first time a team (Lakers) had swept the first three rounds of the playoffs, only to be swept in the finals. As of today, the Pistons are the most recent Eastern Conference team to sweep an NBA Finals. The Pistons teams clinched all four series on the road, which were later followed by the 1999 San Antonio Spurs and the 2016 Cleveland Cavaliers.

For their rough physical play, and sometimes arrogant demeanor, Pistons' center Bill Laimbeer nicknamed the team 'The Bad Boys'. The name became an unofficial 'slogan' for the Pistons throughout the next season as well.

Following the series, Kareem Abdul-Jabbar announced his retirement at 42, after 20 years with the NBA.

Pistons' guard Joe Dumars was named MVP for the series.

Prior to the 2014 NBA Finals, the Pistons were the last Finals champion to have been runner-up to the same opponent the previous season as they did in the 1988 Finals.

Background

Detroit Pistons

Before the season began, the Pistons moved from the Silverdome in Pontiac, Michigan to the brand-new The Palace of Auburn Hills, Michigan. The new arena was envisioned by Pistons owner William Davidson. The arena consisted of luxury boxes and club seating, which added profits compared to older arenas. The Pistons sold out all 41 games at The Palace.

The team itself was also an improvement, highlighted by a mid-season trade that sent Adrian Dantley to the Dallas Mavericks for Mark Aguirre. With Aguirre taking over the starting small forward spot, the Pistons went on a tear, winning 31 of its final 37 games to finish with a league-best 63–19 record.

Their second-half momentum carried over to the playoffs, sweeping both the Boston Celtics and the Milwaukee Bucks in the first two rounds. However, they lost two of the first three games to their archrival Chicago Bulls in the conference finals, but after devising the Jordan Rules scheme to contain Michael Jordan, the Pistons won the final three games to earn another Finals berth.

Los Angeles Lakers

Prior to the season, Kareem Abdul-Jabbar announced that the 1988–89 season was to be his last. Therefore, his 'retirement tour' consisted of pregame tributes in every arena to pay homage to the retiring Lakers captain.

Seeking to become the first team since the Boston Celtics dynasty of the 1960s to win three consecutive championships, the Lakers managed to put up a conference-best 57–25 record. The team's core remained mostly intact, save for veteran forward Kurt Rambis, who was drafted by the Charlotte Hornets in the expansion draft. Their most notable addition was former Chicago Bulls forward Orlando Woolridge.

In the playoffs, the Lakers turned it up a notch. They became the first team to win their first 11 playoff games, as they swept the Portland Trail Blazers, Seattle SuperSonics and Phoenix Suns in each of the first three rounds. Magic Johnson won the MVP award that year.

Road to the Finals

Regular season series
The Detroit Pistons won both games in the regular season series:

Series summary

Game Summaries

Game 1

Just before Game 1, Lakers guard Byron Scott suffered a severe hamstring injury in practice; he would miss the series. His absence would especially be felt on the defensive end. Magic Johnson had a size advantage, but was too slow to defend against the Pistons' three-headed backcourt monster of Joe Dumars, Isiah Thomas, and Vinnie Johnson. Super-sub Michael Cooper would have to log more minutes than he was accustomed to, and rookie David Rivers was inexperienced. Another option was Tony Campbell, but he played very little during the season.

Without Scott's quick switches and help defense, the Piston guards smoked the Lakers in Game 1. Thomas had 24 points, Dumars 22, and Johnson 19. With six minutes left, Detroit led 97-79, and the final score was 109–97.

Game 2

The short-handed Lakers snapped right back in Game 2, pounding the boards and taking a strong first-quarter lead. Joe Dumars had a hot first half with 24 points (he would finish with 33) to keep Detroit close. Los Angeles held a 62–56 lead at halftime.

With about four minutes left in the third period, a major misfortune would befall the Lakers, leading 75–73. John Salley blocked a Mychal Thompson shot, which started a Detroit fast break. Magic Johnson dropped back to play defense, and in so doing, pulled his hamstring. Magic was visibly hurt and frustrated, and had to be coaxed into leaving the floor. Dick Stockton, commentating for CBS, said, "I've never seen him (Magic) look like that", referring to Magic's look of intense pain combined with resignation.

The Pistons had made the bucket on the break to tie the game at 75–75, but the Lakers, minus Johnson, charged to a 90–81 lead late in the period. In the fourth, however, the Lakers missed three easy baskets and committed an offensive foul as Detroit first tied the game, then went up 102–95. The gritty Lakers charged back and cut the lead to 106–104. The Pistons committed a 24-second violation, giving the Lakers the ball with eight seconds left.

James Worthy drove to the basket and was fouled, giving him an opportunity to tie the game. But the 1988 Finals MVP missed the first free throw.  He made the second, bringing the Lakers within one, 106–105. Isiah Thomas then hit two free throws with one second remaining to give the Pistons a three-point lead and the Lakers, who called timeout to advance the ball to midcourt, one last chance to force overtime, but Jeff Lamp lost the ball on the inbound pass, and the horn sounded, ending Game 2 with the Pistons winning, 108–105, to take a 2–0 series lead.

Game 3

The Pistons had a 2–0 series lead, but knew it would be tough going in L.A. Magic Johnson tried to play, but the pain of his hamstring injury was just too great. He left Game 3 after just five minutes with the Lakers leading, 11–8.

Without Magic, the Lakers made a heroic effort. James Worthy scored 26 points, and the 42-year-old Kareem Abdul-Jabbar found the fountain of youth, contributing 24 points and 13 rebounds. Michael Cooper, the last remaining backcourt veteran, had 13 assists and 15 points. But it wasn't enough.

Dennis Rodman, despite suffering from painful back spasms, pulled down 19 rebounds between trips to the sideline for rubdowns. But the main effort came from the guards. Joe Dumars scored 31, including a remarkable third quarter in which he scored 17 consecutive points (21 in all for the period). Vinnie Johnson added 17, including 13 points in the fourth. Isiah Thomas pitched in with 26 points and eight assists, including six and three in the final period.

The Pistons led 113–108 with 15 seconds left when Thomas allowed A. C. Green to tie him up and steal the ball. Thomas then fouled Lakers rookie point guard David Rivers, who made both free throws, pulling Los Angeles to within three at 113–110 with 13 seconds left. Dumars then lost the ball out of bounds with nine seconds left, giving the Lakers a shot at the tie.

The Lakers then ran a play where Rivers got free for an open three-pointer in the corner. Dumars lunged and blocked the shot, and saved the ball from going out of bounds. The Pistons then ran out the clock after Bill Laimbeer's free throw to close the game with a 114–110 win, putting them on the verge of an unexpected sweep.

Game 4

With the Lakers' backs to the wall, coach Pat Riley admonished key offensive player James Worthy to step up his game. Worthy responded with a championship effort of 40 points on 17-of-26 field-goal shooting with Rick Mahorn in his face every step of the way. The Forum crowd was also anticipating Kareem Abdul-Jabbar's possible curtain call. During the pregame warmups and introductions, Kareem received several ovations.

With Worthy playing out of his mind, the Lakers took a 35–23 lead at the end of the first period. Despite trouble at the free-throw line (11 missed), the Pistons began to claw back as Los Angeles led 55–49 at intermission.

The Pistons started fast in the third quarter, beginning with a three-point basket by Bill Laimbeer. Mahorn then scored four quick points, and the Pistons took a 59–58 lead moments later. Dumars hit a driving bank shot, drew the foul and made the free throw, giving him 19 points on the evening. Mahorn followed that with another bucket and the Lakers called timeout. Worthy led the Lakers back into a 78–76 lead at the end of the third, but they knew the Pistons were coming on.

The Pistons took control of the game in the fourth, with James Edwards scoring particularly well. With 3:23 left and the Pistons leading 100–94, the crowd rose to a standing ovation as Kareem Abdul-Jabbar left the game. For the next two minutes, it seemed nobody wanted to hit a shot. Abdul-Jabbar reentered the game and spun and hit a bank shot with 1:37 left, his last two NBA points, cutting the Pistons' margin to 100–96. Kareem went out of the game with 47 seconds remaining amid thunderous applause.

Laimbeer hit a jumper at the 28-second mark, and the Pistons began celebrating. Riley sent Abdul-Jabbar back in after the timeout, but Michael Cooper missed a three-pointer and Isiah Thomas was fouled. Riley then sent Orlando Woolridge in for Abdul-Jabbar, this time for good, prompting a standing ovation from the crowd and acknowledgment from the players on both the Lakers and, in a rare show of sportsmanship, the Pistons. Thomas then hit the foul shots, closing out the 105–97 win and the championship. Dumars was named Finals MVP.

This was the first NBA Finals that ended in a four-game sweep since the Finals went to the 2–3–2 format in 1985.

Team rosters

Detroit Pistons

Los Angeles Lakers

Player statistics

Detroit Pistons

|-
| align="left" |  || 4 || 4 || 26.8 || .364 || .000 || .750 || 6.0 || 1.5 || 0.5 || 0.0 || 7.5 
|-
| align="left" |  || 1 || 0 || 2.0 || .000 || .000 || 0.0 || 0.0 || 0.0 || 0.0 || 0.0 || 0.0 
|-! style="background:#FDE910;"
| align="left" |  || 4 || 4 || 36.8 || .576 || .000 || .868 || 1.8 || 6.0 || 0.5 || 0.3 || 27.3 
|-
| align="left" |  || 4 || 0 || 24.3 || .444 || 0.0 || .750 || 3.5 || 0.8 || 0.0 || 0.8 || 9.0 
|-
| align="left" |  || 4 || 0 || 23.8 || .600 || .200 || .636 || 3.3 || 2.8 || 0.0 || 0.3 || 17.0 
|-
| align="left" |  || 4 || 4 || 23.5 || .545 || .667 || .857 || 5.3 || 2.3 || 0.5 || 0.0 || 8.0 
|-
| align="left" |  || 1 || 0 || 2.0 || 1.000 || .000 || .000 || 0.0 || 0.0 || 0.0 || 0.0 || 2.0 
|-
| align="left" |  || 4 || 4 || 24.5 || .556 || .000 || .667 || 5.3 || 1.0 || 0.3 || 0.8 || 6.0 
|-
| align="left" |  || 4 || 0 || 23.5 || .467 || .000 || .857 || 10.0 || 1.3 || 0.5 || 0.3 || 5.0 
|-
| align="left" |  || 4 || 0 || 20.3 || .684 || .000 || .571 || 2.5 || 1.3 || 0.3 || 2.8 || 7.5 
|-
| align="left" |  || 4 || 4 || 35.3 || .485 || .333 || .760 || 2.5 || 7.3 || 1.5 || 0.3 || 21.3 
|-
| align="left" |  || 1 || 0 || 2.0 || .000 || .000 || 0.0 || 0.0 || 1.0 || 0.0 || 0.0 || 0.0 

Los Angeles Lakers

|-
| align="left" |  || 4 || 4 || 26.0 || .435 || .000 || .833 || 5.0 || 1.8 || 0.5 || 0.8 || 12.5 
|-
| align="left" |  || 4 || 1 || 20.8 || .625 || .333 || .765 || 2.5 || 1.0 || 0.8 || 0.0 || 11.0 
|-
| align="left" |  || 4 || 4 || 40.8 || .378 || .333 || .833 || 1.5 || 6.8 || 1.8 || 0.5 || 12.0 
|-
| align="left" |  || 4 || 4 || 33.5 || .440 || .000 || .684 || 9.3 || 0.5 || 1.0 || 0.3 || 8.8 
|-
| align="left" |  || 3 || 3 || 25.0 || .462 || .200 || .909 || 3.7 || 8.0 || 1.0 || 0.0 || 11.7 
|-
| align="left" |  || 4 || 0 || 2.8 || .667 || .000 || .500 || 0.3 || 0.0 || 0.0 || 0.0 || 1.3 
|-
| align="left" |  || 2 || 0 || 2.0 || .000 || .000 || 0.0 || 0.0 || 0.0 || 0.0 || 0.0 || 0.0 
|-
| align="left" |  || 3 || 0 || 8.7 || .333 || .000 || .800 || 1.0 || 1.7 || 0.0 || 0.0 || 4.0 
|-
| align="left" |  || 4 || 0 || 25.8 || .433 || .000 || .636 || 4.8 || 0.8 || 0.3 || 0.5 || 10.0 
|-
| align="left" |  || 4 || 0 || 21.8 || .611 || .000 || .842 || 5.3 || 1.5 || 0.0 || 0.5 || 9.5 
|-
| align="left" |  || 4 || 4 || 42.5 || .481 || .667 || .710 || 4.3 || 3.5 || 0.5 || 1.5 || 25.5

Television coverage
This series was aired on CBS. Dick Stockton and Hubie Brown called the action. Stockton also narrated the season-ending documentary "Motor City Madness" for NBA Entertainment.

That year, Pat O'Brien filled in for Brent Musburger for Game 2 as pre-game, half-time and post-game host as Musburger was on assignment for CBS Sports, the same thing that happened in 1988. CBS used three sideline reporters which were O'Brien (the Pistons' sideline), Lesley Visser (the Lakers' sideline) and James Brown (both teams). This was Musburger's last NBA Finals assignment for CBS, as he was fired on April 1, 1990, months before NBA's television contract with CBS expired.

For the start of 1989 NBA Finals CBS completely revamped their opening montage for their NBA broadcasts. The computer-generated imagery (once again set in and around a virtual arena) was made to look more realistic (live-action footage was incorporated in the backdrops). Also, the familiar theme music (an uptempo series of four notes and three bars composed by Allyson Bellink since the 1983 NBA Finals) each was rearranged to sound more intricate and to have a more emotional impact, along the lines of the network's later World Series coverage. Between the 1989 NBA Finals and the 1990 NBA Finals' intros, the theme music was slightly revised; the 1989 Finals intro incorporated more of a guitar riff, while the 1990 Finals intro featured a little more usage of trumpets.

Aftermath
With the Michigan Wolverines winning the 1989 NCAA Basketball championship two months prior, the Metro Detroit area was home to a National Champion and NBA champion in the same season or calendar year, a similar distinction would occur once more in 1997, when the Detroit Red Wings and Michigan Wolverines won the Stanley Cup and the College Football National Championship respectively. 

The Pistons would repeat as champions in 1990. The Pistons won 59 games that season, then defeated the Indiana Pacers (3-0), New York Knicks (4-1) and Chicago Bulls (4-3) in the first three rounds, before overcoming the Portland Trail Blazers 4–1 in the Finals.

The Lakers earned the league's best record with a 63–19 record in the 1989–90 NBA season, despite losing Kareem Abdul-Jabbar to retirement. However the Lakers fell to the Phoenix Suns 4–1 in the Western Conference Semifinals, after which head coach Pat Riley resigned. The Lakers did make it back to the finals in 1991 but fell to the Bulls in five games.

The Pistons and Lakers met again in the 2004 NBA Finals. Much had changed since they last met, but they still took on the personalities of their respective teams: the more physical, defensive Pistons against the finesse, offensively-minded Lakers. In the rematch, the underdog Pistons, led by Ben Wallace, Chauncey Billups, Richard Hamilton, Rasheed Wallace and Tayshaun Prince, and coached by Larry Brown, upset the star-studded future Hall-of-Fame Lakers team of Kobe Bryant, Shaquille O'Neal, Karl Malone and Gary Payton, and coached by Phil Jackson, in five games.

Two-time NBA All-Star Isaiah Thomas was named after Isiah Thomas as a consequence of this series. The former Thomas' father, a lifelong Lakers fan, bet his son's name on his team winning the series.

References

External links
NBA History
1989 NBA Finals at Basketball Reference

National Basketball Association Finals
Finals
NBA
NBA
GMA Network television specials
20th century in Los Angeles County, California
NBA Finals
NBA Finals
Basketball competitions in Michigan
Basketball competitions in Inglewood, California
Sports in Auburn Hills, Michigan
NBA